The 11th Canadian Comedy Awards, presented by the Canadian Comedy Foundation for Excellence (CCFE), honoured the best live, television, film, and Internet comedy of 2009.  The ceremony was held at the Winter Garden Theatre in Toronto, Ontario, on 18 October 2010 and was hosted by Dave Foley.

Canadian Comedy Awards, also known as Beavers, were awarded in 22 categories. Some winners were picked by members of industry organizations while others were chosen by the Canadian public through an online poll.  The awards ceremony was held during the five-day Canadian Comedy Awards Festival which ran from 14 to 18 October and included 38 shows at six venues.

The TV series Less Than Kind led with seven nominations followed by the film Eating Buccaneers with five.  Less Than Kind won three Beavers, as did the film The Trotsky.  Irwin Barker was posthumously awarded two Beavers and the Dave Broadfoot Award.

Festival and ceremony

The Canadian Comedy Awards (CCA) returned to Toronto, Ontario, in 2010, after a seven-year absence from the city.  This was the first occasion that Toronto hosted the Canadian Comedy Awards Festival, which had grown to the point that a larger city could more easily accommodate the events.  The five-day festival ran from 14 to 18 October and featured 38 shows in six venues. This included stand-up, sketch, improv, and one-person shows.  Venues included Yuk Yuk's, Comedy Bar, Bad Dog Theatre, and Second City.

One notable show was BeerProv in which 18 improvisors competed, drinking beer in successive elimination rounds until one was left.  Sean Tabares won the event and later won the Beaver for best male improvisor.  Catch 23 was another competitive improv show featuring pairs of performers.

A gala was held on 17 October at the Winter Garden Theatre hosted by Mary Walsh. The awards ceremony was held on 18 October hosted by Dave Foley.  Performers included Teresa Pavlinek and Kathryn Greenwood (Women Fully Clothed), Seán Cullen, Gordon Pinsent, Tom Green, and Loretta Swit.

Winners and nominees
Nominees, selected by jury, were announced on 22 June 2010 in Toronto.  Awards were given in 22 categories.

Irwin Barker, who had died the day before nominations were announced, won posthumous Beavers for Canadian Comedy Person of the Year and Best Male Stand-up, as well as the Dave Broadfoot Award for comic genius.

Winners are listed first and highlighted in boldface:

Multimedia

Live

Television

Film

Internet

Special Awards

Multiple wins
The following people, shows, films, etc. received multiple awards

Multiple nominations
The following people, shows, films, etc. received multiple awards

References

External links
Canadian Comedy Awards official website

Canadian Comedy Awards
Canadian Comedy Awards
Awards
Awards